Frederick Victor Bruce-Lyle (6 August 1953 – 21 April 2016) was  a Ghanaian-born jurist who was a judge in several Caribbean countries.

Born in Accra, Ghana, Bruce-Lyle was the second son of Ghana's Supreme Court judge and Supreme Court judge of Zambia, William Bruce-Lyle, and the grandson of Sir Leslie McCarthy. He was educated at  Mfantsipim School, Cape Coast, the Accra Academy and the University of Ghana, where he attained a Bachelor of Laws degree.

From 1979 to 1984, Bruce-Lyle was a State advocate in Zambia, before moving  to the Caribbean where he served as a Magistrate in Belize (1984–89); Saint Vincent and the Grenadines (1989–93); the British Virgin Islands (1993–97); and Antigua and Barbuda (1997–99). He was a naturalised citizen of Saint Vincent and the Grenadines.

In 1999, Bruce-Lyle was appointed by the Judicial and Legal Services Commission of the Caribbean Community as a High Court Justice of the Eastern Caribbean Supreme Court based in Saint Vincent and the Grenadines. In 2013, Bruce-Lyle became the longest serving High Court Judge.

Bruce-Lyle died in Trinidad in 2016 after a brief illness.

Notes

References
Eastern Caribbean Supreme Court: Saint Vincent and the Grenadines
"Caribbean blacks ashamed of African heritage says Ghana-born judge", I-Witness News, 2011-08-14.

1953 births
2016 deaths
Eastern Caribbean Supreme Court justices
Ghanaian judges on the courts of Antigua and Barbuda
Ghanaian judges on the courts of Belize
Ghanaian judges on the courts of the British Virgin Islands
Saint Vincent and the Grenadines judges on the courts of Antigua and Barbuda
Saint Vincent and the Grenadines judges on the courts of Belize
Saint Vincent and the Grenadines judges on the courts of the British Virgin Islands
Ghanaian emigrants to Saint Vincent and the Grenadines
Ghanaian expatriates in Zambia
20th-century Ghanaian judges
Saint Vincent and the Grenadines judges
University of Ghana alumni
Alumni of the Accra Academy
20th-century Zambian lawyers
Ghanaian judges of international courts and tribunals
Bruce family of Ghana
21st-century Ghanaian lawyers